Yeo-jin Ha (born February 4, 1986) is a South Korean actress, known for Spring, Summer, Fall, Winter... and Spring (2003) and 1% of Anything (2003).

Filmography

References

External links

Living people
South Korean film actresses
1986 births